Crispin Jeremy Rupert Blunt (born 15 July 1960) is a British politician who has served as the Member of Parliament (MP) for Reigate since 1997. A member of the Conservative Party, he was the Parliamentary Under-Secretary of State for Prisons and Youth Justice within the Ministry of Justice from 2010 to 2012 and Chair of the Foreign Affairs Select Committee from 2015 until 2017.

Blunt first entered the House of Commons at the 1997 general election, when he replaced the then MP Sir George Gardiner, who had been deselected by the Constituency Conservative Association Executive Council and joined the Referendum Party. In 2013, Blunt was deselected by the Constituency Executive Council, with speculation that this was due to his public announcement that he was gay. However, after a ballot of party members in Reigate, the decision was overturned by a margin of 5–1 and Blunt was reselected as the Conservative candidate for the 2015 general election.

On 1 May 2022, he announced he would be standing down at the next general election.

Early life and career
Blunt was born in Germany, one of three sons of English parents Adrienne (née Richardson) and Major-General Peter Blunt (1923–2003). He was educated at Wellington College, and the Royal Military Academy Sandhurst, where he won the Queen's Medal, gaining a Regular Commission, before reading Politics at the University of Durham (University College) between 1981 and 1984, where he was elected President of the Durham Union Society in 1983 and graduated with a 2:1 degree. In 1991, he gained an MBA at the Cranfield School of Management.

Blunt was commissioned as an Army Officer into the 13th/18th Royal Hussars (Queen Mary's Own) and served until 1990. During the 1980s, he was stationed in Cyprus, Germany and Britain, serving as a Troop Leader, Regimental Operations Officer and Armoured Reconnaissance Squadron Commander. He resigned his commission as a captain in 1990.

Blunt contested his first Parliamentary seat at the 1992 general election, as the Conservative Party candidate in West Bromwich East.  From 1991 to 1992, Blunt was a representative of the Forum of Private Business. In 1993, he was appointed as Special Adviser to Malcolm Rifkind, the then-Secretary of State for Defence, and worked in the same capacity when Rifkind became Foreign Secretary between 1995 and 1997.

Member of Parliament
At the 1997 general election, Blunt was elected to Parliament as Member for Reigate in Surrey, replacing the long-serving strongly Eurosceptic MP Sir George Gardiner, who had been deselected by the local Conservative Party. Blunt was subsequently appointed to the House of Commons Defence Select Committee.

In July 1997, he was elected as Secretary of the Conservative Foreign and Commonwealth Affairs Committee and the Conservative Middle East Council. In May 2000, he joined the House of Commons Environment, Transport and Regional Affairs Select Committee and in July 2003 he was elected Chairman of the Conservative Middle East Council, a position he still occupies.

The new Conservative Party leader Iain Duncan Smith appointed Blunt to the Opposition front bench as Shadow Minister for Northern Ireland in September 2001. In July 2002, he was appointed as deputy to Tim Yeo, Shadow Secretary of State for Trade and Industry. On 1 May 2003 he resigned his position on the front bench, saying that Duncan Smith was a "handicap" to the Conservatives. He decided to resign at that time in the expectation that the Conservative Party would make over 500 gains in the 2003 local government elections, but in the belief that these would be achieved in spite of, rather than because of, Duncan Smith's leadership. Blunt timed his resignation so that it became public after the polls closed but before the results were declared.

The following day he was unanimously reselected by his local party as their prospective parliamentary candidate, but in May 2003 he failed to persuade 25 of his fellow Conservative MPs to call for a vote of confidence. He accepted that no challenge for the party leadership would be immediately forthcoming and returned to the back benches. In November 2003, Michael Howard replaced Duncan Smith after a vote of no confidence.

Blunt became a party whip under Howard, but on 9 June 2005 he took leave of absence from that role to support the expected leadership bid of Malcolm Rifkind. However, when Rifkind was knocked out of the party leadership contest, Blunt returned to the Whips' office and wrote to all party members in his constituency asking them to rank the remaining contenders in order of preference so he could best represent his constituents.

Blunt is a former joint chair of the Council for the Advancement of Arab-British Understanding. When the Conservative and Liberal Democrat Coalition formed a government in 2010, Blunt was appointed as the first Minister of State for Prisons at the Ministry of Justice. His responsibilities included prisons and probation, youth justice, criminal law and sentencing policy, and criminal justice. He is also a member of the All-Party Parliamentary Humanist Group.

In November 2013, Blunt was re-selected to stand in the 2015 general election for the Conservative Party, having undergone a postal ballot of constituency members. The postal ballot was triggered when the executive council came to a vote with a majority decision not to endorse his candidacy. Having won the postal ballot Blunt called for the executive council to consider their position. The lack of support from a majority of the executive council was partly attributed to the allegedly homophobic views of some older Conservative voters in the area. Roger Newstead, the chairman of the Reigate South and Earlswood Branch, wrote a private letter to Dr Ben Mearns, who had resigned from the branch committee after protesting the decision to force a postal ballot. In the letter, Newstead said: "I do not know what motivated my executive colleagues but I suspect that Crispin has been the author of his own misfortune. There is no doubt in my mind that his very public and totally unnecessary announcement that he was 'gay' was the final straw for some members, particularly those in the north of the borough, with whom there had been a number of previous disagreements on policy matters. A number of lady members were very offended by the manner in which his marriage broke down. Apparently Victoria's version was very different from Crispin's".

Later clarifying his views to The Guardian, Newstead said: "I still say it was unnecessary [for Crispin Blunt to come out]. To me it was an error of judgment. I wouldn't have done anything like that. I would have just said if anyone had asked me: politicians have a unique lifestyle, it doesn't suit everybody and there is a long history of parliamentary marriages breaking down. You don't have to go out and tell people you have got homosexual tendencies. It is a private matter and it shouldn't have been put in the public domain. He put it in the public domain".

In May 2014, Blunt was one of seven unsuccessful candidates for the chairmanship of the House of Commons Defence Select Committee. On 19 June 2015, it was announced that Blunt had been elected to the chairmanship of the Foreign Affairs Select Committee, a post he held until 12 July 2017 when he was defeated by Conservative candidate Tom Tugendhat.

Prior to the 2016 EU Referendum, Blunt supported Brexit.

In September 2017, Blunt was elected chair of the All Party Parliamentary Humanist Group, the cross-party group which represents humanists in Parliament. In 2018, he became an honorary associate of the National Secular Society.

On 11 April 2022, after fellow MP Imran Ahmad Khan was found guilty of a child sex offence, Blunt issued a statement in defence of Ahmad Khan which criticised the verdict, describing it as an "international scandal, with dreadful wider implications for millions of LGBT+ Muslims around the world" and said that it "relied on lazy tropes about LGBT+ people". He also said that he hoped for Ahmad Khan to return to public service. Blunt's intervention was strongly condemned and members of the all-party parliamentary group (APPG) on global LGBT+ affairs which was chaired by Blunt resigned in protest. Blunt later apologised for his comments and resigned as chair of the APPG. In May 2022, Blunt backtracked on this apology and described Ahmad Khan's conviction as a "serious miscarriage of justice".

On 1 May 2022, he announced he would be standing down at the next general election.

On 16 October 2022, he became the first Conservative MP to publicly call for Liz Truss to resign, calling it 'blindingly obvious' that she must go.

Political views
A long-term Eurosceptic, Blunt issued a pamphlet in 1998 when first elected to parliament which called for an in-out referendum. In June 2016, Blunt championed LGBT rights, during the campaigning of the EU referendum, stating that the UK would be the "world's leading proponents of LGBTI rights, in or out of the EU". Blunt has been described as "a long-term critic of Israel".

He voted against the Cameron–Clegg coalition government in 2013 on the issue of British military intervention in the Syrian civil war.

Blunt has spoken out about the presence of prayers as part of Parliament's formal business. He put forward an Early Day Motion on the issue in 2019, arguing that the practice was discriminatory against non-religious MPs, since those MPs who choose to pray are able to reserve a seat for parliamentary business that day and are more likely to ask questions; there are 650 elected MPs in the UK Parliament, but only enough seating for 427 at any one time. In 2020, he again raised the issue in the House, with new speaker Lindsay Hoyle expressing sympathy with the need for reform.

Blunt is one of the most prominent Conservative advocates of transgender rights. He argues that supporting transgender individuals is an extension of the party's tradition of supporting individual liberty.

On 16 October 2022 Blunt stated in his opinion Liz Truss would have  to resign as Prime Minister.  Blunt said, “I think the game is up and it’s now a question as to how the succession is managed.  If there is such a weight of opinion in the parliamentary party that we have to have a change, then it will be effected.” He was the first Conservative MP to openly call for Truss's resignation.

Personal life
Blunt married Victoria Jenkins in September 1990 in Kensington and they have a daughter, Claudia (born March 1992), and son, Frederick (born August 1994). His niece is the actress Emily Blunt. In August 2010, he announced that he was leaving his wife in order "to come to terms with his homosexuality". They remain separated but have not divorced.

Blunt's voting record in Parliament had previously been broadly unsympathetic towards gay rights. He later stated regret for that part of his voting record. In January 2016, he stated that he uses poppers, during a parliamentary debate that discussed banning them along with other legal highs. He stated, "I out myself as a user of poppers. I am astonished to find [the government] is proposing it to be banned and frankly so would many other gay men."

Blunt is a keen cricketer, representing the Parliamentarians team, alongside fellow MPs Peter Bone and Hugh Robertson. He is also a member of the Marylebone Cricket Club.

References

External links
 Crispin Blunt MP official constituency website

 Resignation statement, 1 May 2003
 Profile: Crispin Blunt, BBC News, 2 May 2003

1960 births
Living people
13th/18th Royal Hussars officers
Alumni of Cranfield University
Alumni of University College, Durham
Conservative Party (UK) MPs for English constituencies
English humanists
British secularists
LGBT members of the Parliament of the United Kingdom
People educated at Wellington College, Berkshire
Graduates of the Royal Military Academy Sandhurst
UK MPs 1997–2001
UK MPs 2001–2005
UK MPs 2005–2010
UK MPs 2010–2015
UK MPs 2015–2017
UK MPs 2017–2019
English LGBT politicians
Reigate
Presidents of the Durham Union
UK MPs 2019–present
Gay politicians
LGBT military personnel
21st-century LGBT people
British Eurosceptics